Adrián Eduardo Villalobos Orozco (born 12 November 1997) is a Mexican professional footballer who plays as a midfielder for UdeG.

References

External links
 
 

1997 births
Living people
Association football midfielders
Mexican footballers
Leones Negros UdeG footballers